Cuphodes paragrapta is a moth of the family Gracillariidae. It is known to originate from Guyana.

References

Cuphodes
Moths described in 1915